The men's 100 m backstroke swimming events for the 2016 Summer Paralympics took place at the Olympic Aquatics Stadium from 8 to 17 September. A total of eleven events are contested for eleven different classifications.

Competition format
Each event consists of two rounds: heats and final. The top eight swimmers overall in the heats progress to the final. If there are less than eight swimmers in an event, no heats are held and all swimmers qualify for the final.

Results

S1

The S1 event took place on 9 September.

S2

The S2 event took place on 9 September.

S6

The S6 event took place on 8 September.

S7

The S7 event took place on 8 September.

S8

19:21 13 September 2016:

S9

17:43 16 September 2016:

S10

The S10 event took place on 10 September.

S11

The S11 event took place on 9 September.

S12

18:34 14 September 2016:

S13

18:53 17 September 2016:

S14

The S14 event took place on 8 September.

References

Swimming at the 2016 Summer Paralympics